Lena Halliday (1872 – 19 December 1937) was an English stage and film actress.

She as born Selina Heinekey in Balham, London, UK and died in Battersea, London, UK.

Selected filmography
 Motherland (1927)
 Adam's Apple (1928)
 Sir or Madam (1928)
 When Knights Were Bold (1929)
 Inquest (1931)
 Girls, Please! (1934)

References

External links
 

1870s births
1937 deaths
English film actresses
English stage actresses
English silent film actresses
20th-century English actresses
People from Balham
19th-century British actresses
British stage actresses
19th-century English women
19th-century English people